

Surname 
Meredith is a Welsh surname. Notable people with the surname include:
Adam Meredith (1913–1976), British bridge player
Amaza Lee Meredith (1895–1984), American architect, educator and artist
Andrew Meredith (born 1972), field hockey coach
Anna Meredith (born 1978), British musician and composer
Bevan Meredith (1927-2019), Anglican Archbishop of Papua New Guinea
Billy Meredith (1874–1958), Welsh footballer
Bryn Meredith, Welsh rugby union player
Burgess Meredith, American actor
Carew Arthur Meredith, Anglo-Irish mathematician and logician
Carole Meredith, American grape geneticist
Charles Meredith (disambiguation), multiple people
Cla Meredith, Major League Baseball pitcher for the San Diego Padres
Courtney Meredith, Welsh rugby union player
Don Meredith, American football player and sportscaster; quarterback for the Dallas Cowboys
Dorothy Meredith (1906–1986) was an American artist and educator, known for fiber art.
Edmund Allen Meredith, Canadian politician and principal of McGill University, Montreal
Edwin Thomas Meredith, United States Secretary of Agriculture under Woodrow Wilson
Frederick Edmund Meredith, 8th Chancellor of Bishop's University, Lennoxville
Geechie Meredith, American baseball player
George Meredith, 19th century English author
Hilary Meredith British solicitor and professor
Jack R. Meredith, American engineer and organizational theorist
James Meredith, first African American student at the University of Mississippi
James Meredith (footballer) (born 1988), Australian football (soccer) player
James Meredith (Medal of Honor), American Medal of Honor recipient
James Creed Meredith, Irish lawyer, judge and Kant scholar
Sir James Creed Meredith, Irish prominent Freemason
Jamon Meredith (born 1986), American football player
John Meredith (rugby player), Welsh rugby union player
John Walsingham Cooke Meredith, father of the 'Eight London Merediths'
Jonathan Meredith, United States Marine during the First Barbary War
Lois Meredith (1898–1967), stage and movie actress
Martin Meredith, British writer
Ralph Creed Meredith, Anglo-Irish clergyman, chaplain to George VI
Richard Meredith (bishop), 16th century Anglo-Irish Bishop of Leighlin and Ferns
Richard Edmund Meredith, Master of the Rolls in Ireland
Richard Martin Meredith, Canadian chief justice
Sir Roger Meredith, 5th Baronet
Samuel Meredith, delegate to the Continental Congress and Treasurer of the United States
Ted Meredith, winner of two gold medals at the 1912 Summer Olympics
Thomas Meredith, Anglo-Irish clergyman and mathematician
Thomas Graves Meredith, Canadian lawyer and businessman
Sir Vincent Meredith, 1st Baronet of Montreal, President of the Bank of Montreal
Sir William Collis Meredith, Chief Justice of the Superior Court of the Province of Quebec
William Campbell James Meredith, Canadian lawyer
William M. Meredith, Secretary of the Treasury of the United States
William Morris Meredith, Jr., American poet
Sir William Ralph Meredith, Canadian chief justice and leader of the conservative party

References

English-language surnames
Anglicised Welsh-language surnames